Wytopitlock is an unincorporated village in Reed Plantation, Aroostook County, Maine, United States. Wytopitlock is located on the Mattawamkeag River and is served by Maine State Route 171.

References

Villages in Aroostook County, Maine
Villages in Maine